Potosi is a city in Washington County, Missouri, United States. Potosi is seventy-two miles southwest of St. Louis. The population was 2,660 as of the 2010 census. It is the county seat of Washington County. 

Located in the Lead Belt, the city was founded in 1763 by French colonists as " Mine à Breton"  or Mine au Breton."  After the United States acquired this area, American Moses Austin renamed the community for the Bolivian silver-mining city of Potosí. He was involved in lead mining.

Geography

Potosi is located in the Lead Belt region of Missouri, as such, it has mining operations in the area. It is also geographically considered part of the St. Francois Mountain Range, meaning it has hilly terrain typical of the region.

The city is within close proximity to many nature areas including Mark Twain National Forest and Washington State Park.

Climate

History 

A lead mining settlement at this spot, "Mine à Breton" or Mine au Breton, was founded between 1760 and 1780 by Francis Azor, of Brittany, France. Moses Austin came here in 1798 with his family, including his son Stephen F. Austin.  Moses obtained a grant of 7,153 arpents of land from the Spanish Empire and started large-scale mining operations, building his town to support it.  Moses named the town after Potosí in Bolivia, which was famous for its vast silver mines.  Austin's tomb and the foundation of his home Durham Hall can still be seen.  Another mining entrepreneur in Potosi at the time of Moses Austin was James Bryan. Firmin Rene Desloge, who emigrated from Nantes, France in 1822 as the progenitor of the Desloge Family in America, located in Potosi and established a mercantile, distillery, fur trading and lead smelting business. The Desloge lead mining business Desloge Lead Company and later Desloge Consolidated Lead Company was later relocated to Bonne Terre, MO and also Desloge, MO by his son Firmin V. Desloge.

Potosi was designated county seat in 1814.

Potosi Is also home to the oldest standing Presbyterian church west of the Mississippi River. It is located on West Breton Street, also home to the graveyard that contains the tomb of Moses Austin and his wife Maria Brown Austin.

The Potosi Correctional Center, which opened in 1989, housed Missouri's death row and the state's executions were handled at the prison until 2005.  The Potosi Center conducted all but one of the 62 Missouri executions between 1989 when capital punishment was reinstated and 2005 when executions  were moved 25 miles east to the Eastern Reception, Diagnostic and Correctional Center in Bonne Terre, Missouri.

Woodcut artist Tom Huck grew up in Potosi, where he has taken inspiration from many of the region's local legends and folk tales.  In 1998, Huck released "2 Weeks in August: 14 Rural Absurdities", a suite of 14 woodcut prints based on bizarre tales from the town's history.

The George Cresswell Furnace, Palmer Historic Mining District, Washington County Courthouse, and Washington State Park CCC Historic District are listed on the National Register of Historic Places.

Demographics

2010 census
As of the census of 2010, there were 2,660 people, 1,114 households, and 657 families living in the city. The racial makeup of the city was 95.2% White, 2.2% African American, 0.4% Native American, 0.4% Asian, 0.3% from other races, and 1.6% from two or more races. Hispanic or Latino of any race were 1.6% of the population.

There were 1,114 households, of which 32.2% had children under the age of 18 living with them, 37.0% were married couples living together, 17.8% had a female householder with no husband present, 4.2% had a male householder with no wife present, and 41.0% were non-families. 36.4% of all households were made up of individuals, and 14.9% had someone living alone who was 65 years of age or older. The average household size was 2.23 and the average family size was 2.86.

The median age in the city was 39.1 years. 24.2% of residents were under the age of 18; 8.8% were between the ages of 18 and 24; 23.9% were from 25 to 44; 24.3% were from 45 to 64; and 18.7% were 65 years of age or older. The gender makeup of the city was 44.1% male and 55.9% female.

2000 census
As of the census of 2000, there were 2,662 people, 1,103 households, and 677 families living in the city. The population density was 1,218.9 people per square mile (471.5/km). There were 1,211 housing units at an average density of 554.5 per square mile (214.5/km). The racial makeup of the city was 95.60% White, 2.14% African American, 0.45% Native American, 0.15% Asian, 0.23% from other races, and 1.43% from two or more races. Hispanic or Latino of any race were 0.83% of the population.

There were 1,103 households, out of which 33.3% had children under the age of 18 living with them, 40.1% were married couples living together, 17.7% had a female householder with no husband present, and 38.6% were non-families. 35.7% of all households were made up of individuals, and 17.8% had someone living alone who was 65 years of age or older. The average household size was 2.30 and the average family size was 2.97.

In the city, the population was spread out, with 26.7% under the age of 18, 9.2% from 18 to 24, 25.9% from 25 to 44, 20.2% from 45 to 64, and 18.0% who were 65 years of age or older. The median age was 36 years. For every 100 females there were 81.5 males. For every 100 females age 18 and over, there were 75.9 males.

The median income for a household in the city was $17,702, and the median income for a family was $23,958. Males had a median income of $31,548 versus $16,976 for females. The per capita income for the city was $12,417. About 28.1% of families and 31.4% of the population were below the poverty line, including 42.7% of those under age 18 and 13.9% of those age 65 or over.

Government and infrastructure
Potosi is the county seat of Washington County, therefore hosts both city and county government offices. Namely, City Hall and The Washington County Courthouse and government offices within.

The United States Postal Service operates the Potosi Post Office.

The Potosi Correctional Center of the Missouri Department of Corrections is located in an unincorporated area in Washington County, near Potosi. The prison houses male death row inmates.

Education
Public education in Potosi is administered by the Potosi R-III School District. Potosi has a public library, the Washington County Library.

Notable people 
Moses Austin, American settlement colonizer in St. Genevieve, Missouri and father of Stephen Austin of the Republic of Texas 
Firmin Rene Desloge, progenitor of the Desloge Family in America
Firmin V. Desloge, Founder Desloge Consolidated Lead Company and Desloge, Missouri and Bonne Terre, Missouri
Donne Wall, baseball player
Tom Huck, artist/printmaker
John A. Lankford Architect
Dylan Coleman MLB pitcher

References

External links

 Historic maps of Potosi in the Sanborn Maps of Missouri Collection at the University of Missouri

Cities in Washington County, Missouri
County seats in Missouri
Populated places established in 1799
French colonial settlements of Upper Louisiana
1799 establishments in the Spanish Empire
1799 establishments in North America
Cities in Missouri